Birds of a Feather, also known as Manou the Swift or Swift, is a 2019 German 3D computer-animated adventure comedy film directed by Christian Haas and Andrea Block. The film features the voices of Kate Winslet, Willem Dafoe, Josh Keaton, Cassandra Steen and David Shaughnessy.

Cast 
 Kate Winslet as Blanche, Yves' wife who is the first to discover Manou and take him in
 Willem Dafoe as Yves, the strong-willed but stubborn leader of the seagull colony
 Josh Keaton as Manou, an orphaned Swift who was adopted and raised by seagulls 
 Cassandra Steen as Kalifa, a female Swift and Manou's love interest
 Mikey Kelley as Luc, Manou's adoptive brother with whom he shares a strong bond 
 David Shaughnessy as Percival, a flightless bird who lives in a cemetery, and frequently hangs around with the Swifts
 Arif S. Kinchen as Poncho, a short, fat Swift and one of Kalifa's brothers
 Nolan North as Yusuf, a slim, taller Swift and one of Kalifa's brothers
 Julie Nathanson as Francoise, a student at the sailing school and a rival of Manou
 Rob Paulsen as Sandpipers

Plot 
The film follows the adventures of Manou, a swift who was raised by seagulls and struggles to fit in with them, as well as his journey to accepting his identity as a swift and earning the respect of seagulls and swifts alike.

References

External links
 
 

2019 films
2019 3D films
2019 comedy films
2019 computer-animated films
2010s German animated films
2010s children's adventure films
2010s children's comedy films
2010s children's animated films
2010s adventure comedy films
2010s English-language films
German 3D films
German computer-animated films
German children's adventure films
German children's comedy films
German adventure comedy films
Jungle adventure films
Animated adventure films
Animated comedy films
3D animated films
English-language German films
Animated films about birds
Anthropomorphic animals
Films set in Germany
Films set on beaches
Films set in jungles
Animated films set on islands
Films set in 2019
2010s German films